The  molecule, known as trisulfur, sulfur trimer, thiozone, or triatomic sulfur, is a cherry-red  allotrope of sulfur. It has been observed at cryogenic temperatures as a solid. Under ordinary conditions it converts to cyclooctasulfur.

8 S3 → 3 S8

Structure and bonding
In terms of structure and bonding  and ozone are similar. Both adopt bent structures and are diamagnetic. Although represented with S=S double bonds, the bonding situation is more complex.   

However, cyclic , where the sulfur atoms are arranged in an equilateral triangle with three single bonds (similar to cyclic ozone and cyclopropane), is calculated to be lower in energy than the bent structure experimentally observed.

The name thiozone was invented by Hugo Erdmann in 1908 who hypothesized that  comprises a large proportion of liquid sulfur. However its existence was unproven until the experiments of J. Berkowitz in 1964. Using mass spectrometry, he showed that sulfur vapour contains the  molecule. Above   is the second most common molecule after  in gaseous sulfur.

 can also be generated by photolysis of  embedded in a glass or matrix of solid noble gas.

Natural occurrence

Reactions

Formation of compounds with a defined number of sulfur atoms is possible:

 +  →  (cyclic)

Radical anion

Although  is elusive under ordinary conditions, the radical anion  is abundant. It exhibits an intense blue colour. The anion is sometimes called thiozonide, by analogy with the ozonide anion, to which it is valence isoelectronic. The gemstone lapis lazuli and the mineral lazurite (from which the pigment ultramarine is derived) contain . International Klein Blue, developed by Yves Klein, also contains the  radical anion.

This ion is probably important in movement of copper and gold in hydrothermal fluids.

The material is strongly blue-coloured when dry and changes colour to green and yellow in the presence of trace amounts of water. Another way to make it is with polysulfide dissolved in hexamethylphosphoramide where it gives a blue colour.

Other methods of production of  include reacting sulfur with slightly dampened magnesium oxide.

Raman spectroscopy can be used to identify  , and it can be used non-destructively in paintings.

Trisulfide ion
The trisulfide ion,  is part of the polysulfide series. The bonds are single. It is isoelectronic to sulfur dichloride.

References

External links

Allotropes of sulfur
Homonuclear triatomic molecules
Gases with color